Lamar High School is the public high school in Lamar, Missouri, USA. It is part of the Lamar R-I School District. The school's football field is named Thomas M. O'Sullivan Stadium and the baseball field is named Shoff Field.

Sports
The Lamar High School Athletic Department was founded in 1905. The teams' nickname is the Tigers. Lamar competes in Class 1 for tennis, Class 2 for football and cross country, and Class 3 in baseball, basketball, and track and field.

The school has won eight state championships in football seven of them consecutive (2011–2017) & (2020), two championships in track and field (2013, 2014), and three in cross country (2012, 2016, 2017).

References

External links
 Lamar R-I School District home page

Public high schools in Missouri
Schools in Barton County, Missouri